Ruggero Verroca (born 3 January 1961) is an Italian lightweight rower. He won a gold medal at the 1980 World Rowing Championships in Hazewinkel with the lightweight men's double scull.

References

1961 births
Living people
Italian male rowers
World Rowing Championships medalists for Italy
Olympic rowers of Italy
Rowers at the 1984 Summer Olympics